The 1954–55 season was Chelsea Football Club's 50th of competitive football, their Golden Jubilee and their 20th consecutive year in the English top flight. It was also the club's most successful year up to that point, as they won the Football League Championship for the first time.

The success was unexpected; Chelsea had never won a major trophy before and their league positions since the Second World War had ranged from 8th to 20th. They also began this season inauspiciously, and the club were languishing in 12th place after four consecutive defeats in October. Subsequently, results improved and the team lost just three of their next 25 matches, ultimately securing the title with a game to spare. Key to the success were two wins against their principal title rivals Wolverhampton Wanderers and a ten match unbeaten streak during the title run-in. Club captain Roy Bentley finished as top scorer, with 21 goals, and the club attracted an average home gate of 48,307, the highest in the division.

As champions of England, Chelsea were invited to enter the inaugural European Cup.  They initially accepted, but later withdrew from the competition under pressure from the Football League, who saw the tournament as a distraction to domestic football.

Results

First Division

FA Cup

Players Used

References
General
Soccerbase
Hockings, Ron. 100 Years of the Blues: A Statistical History of Chelsea Football Club. (2007)

Specific

Chelsea
Chelsea F.C. seasons
1955